Sébastien Parfait is a jewellery designer from Paris.

Sébastien Parfait began to imagine and design jewelry very early on, a vocation that has never left him, and that became a reality when, five years after he first started, he entered the prestigious École du Louvre (HBJO). He graduated first in his class in 1995, with a gold medal to boot. In order to further explore his creativity and acquire the professional know-how, he went on to attend the Lyon School of Jewelry, where he received a degree in Fine art. After a first experience working for Cartier, he worked in several renowned houses, all the while working on his own creations, for which he quickly built up a clientele. He recently created his own company, and he now spends all of
his time designing and making original pieces.

His pleasure in transforming the organic matter is based on a personal aesthetic
inclination toward mobility and clean lines. The piece must have some mobility
in itself, but also in relation to other elements. Soldering traces disappear,
while playfulness prevails. Pursuing clean lines leads to a minimalism that
banishes heaviness and excess.

References

External links 
Sebastien Parfait, Official website

Living people
French jewellers
Year of birth missing (living people)